Vĕslav Michalik (1 March 1963 – 12 June 2022) was a Czech politician. A member of Mayors and Independents, he served on the Central Bohemian Regional Council from 2012 to 2022. He was also mayor of Dolní Břežany from 2004 to 2022.

Birth
Michalik was born on 1 March 1963 in Český Těšín, Czechoslovakia.

Death
Michalik died on the hill Vlčí hora in Krásná Lípa on 12 June 2022, at the age of 59.

References

1963 births
2022 deaths
21st-century Czech politicians
Czech physicists
Mayors of places in the Czech Republic
Mayors and Independents politicians
Czech Technical University in Prague alumni
People from Český Těšín